was a  after Chōroku and before Bunshō. This period spanned from December 1460 through February 1466.

Change of era
 1460 : The era name was changed to mark an event or a number of events. The old era ended and a new one commenced in Chōroku 4.

Events of the Kanshō era
 1460 (Kanshō 1, 9th month): Wakae Castle in Kawachi Province was destroyed when  was forced out of it.
 1461 (Kanshō 2): Kanshō famine was ceased.
 August 21, 1464 (Kanshō 5, 19th day of the 7th month): Go-Hanazono resigned his throne in favor of his son, who would be known as Emperor Go-Tsuchimikado.

Notes

References
 Nussbaum, Louis Frédéric and Käthe Roth. (2005). Japan Encyclopedia. Cambridge: Harvard University Press. ; OCLC 48943301
 Ponsonby-Fane, Richard Arthur Brabazon. Ponsonby-Fane, Richard. (1956).  Kyoto: The Old Capital of Japan, 794-1869. Kyoto: Ponsonby Memorial Society. OCLC 36644
 Titsingh, Isaac. (1834). Nihon Odai Ichiran; ou,  Annales des empereurs du Japon.  Paris: Royal Asiatic Society, Oriental Translation Fund of Great Britain and Ireland. OCLC 5850691

External links
 National Diet Library, "The Japanese Calendar" -- historical overview plus illustrative images from library's collection

Japanese eras
1460s in Japan